Palotai is a Hungarian surname. Notable people with the surname include:

Gábor Palotai (born 1956), Swedish–Hungarian designer, artist, graphic designer and typographer
Károly Palotai (1935–2018), Hungarian footballer and referee
Oliver Palotai (born 1974), German musician

Hungarian-language surnames